Twilight's Last Gleaming is a 1977 thriller film directed by Robert Aldrich and starring Burt Lancaster and Richard Widmark. The film was a West German/American co-production, shot mainly at the Bavaria Studios.

Loosely based on a 1971 novel, Viper Three by Walter Wager, it tells the story of Lawrence Dell, a renegade USAF general who escapes from a military prison and takes over an ICBM silo in Montana, threatening to launch the missiles and start World War III unless the President reveals a top secret document to the American people about the Vietnam War.

A split screen technique is used at several points in the movie to give the audience insight into the simultaneously occurring strands of the storyline. The film's title, which functions on several levels, is taken from "The Star-Spangled Banner", the national anthem of the United States:
O say can you see, by the dawn's early light, / What so proudly we hailed at the twilight's last gleaming?

Plot
After escaping from a military prison, rogue Air Force General Lawrence Dell and accomplices Powell, Garvas, and Hoxey infiltrate a Montana ICBM complex that Dell helped design. Their goal is to gain control over its nine Titan nuclear missiles. The infiltration does not go as planned, as the impulsive Hoxey guns down an Air Force guard for trying to answer a ringing phone. Dell then shoots and kills Hoxey. The three then make direct contact with the US government (avoiding any media attention) and demand a $10 million ransom and that the President go on national television and make public the contents of a top-secret document.

The document, which is unknown to the current president but not to certain members of his cabinet, contains conclusive proof that the US government knew there was no realistic hope of winning the Vietnam War but continued fighting for the sole purpose of demonstrating to the Soviet Union their unwavering commitment to defeating Communism.

Meanwhile, Dell and his two remaining men remove the security countermeasures to the launch control system and gain full control over the complex.

While the President and his Cabinet debate the practical, political, personal, and ethical aspects of agreeing to the demands, they also authorize the military to send an elite team led by General MacKenzie to penetrate the ICBM complex and incinerate its command center with a low-yield tactical nuclear device. Just as the device is about to be set, the commando team accidentally trips an alarm, alerting Dell to their operation. A furious Dell responds by initiating the launch sequence for all nine missiles. As the military and President Stevens watch the underground missile silo launch covers begin to open, they agree to call off the attempt and the launch is aborted with mere seconds to spare. During this time, the captive Air Force guards attempt to overpower Dell and his men, resulting in the death of Garvas and another guard.

Eventually, the President agrees to meet the demands, which include allowing himself to be taken hostage and used as a human shield while Dell and Powell make their escape from the complex. As the President leaves the White House, he asks the Secretary of Defense to release the document should he be killed in the process. US Air Force snipers take aim and shoot both Dell and Powell, but also accidentally shoot the President, who with his dying breath asks the Secretary of Defense if he will release the document. The Secretary cannot bring himself to answer.

Cast
 Burt Lancaster as General Lawrence Dell
 Richard Widmark as General Martin MacKenzie
 Charles Durning as President David Stevens
 Melvyn Douglas as Secretary of Defense Guthrie
 Joseph Cotten as Secretary of State Renfrew
 Paul Winfield as Willis Powell
 Burt Young as Augie Garvas
 Richard Jaeckel as Lieutenant Colonel Sandy Towne
 Roscoe Lee Browne as James Forrest
 William Marshall as Attorney General Klinger
 Gerald S. O'Loughlin as Brigadier General O'Rourke
 Leif Erickson as Ralph Whittaker
 Charles Aidman as Bernstein
 Charles McGraw as Air Force General Crane
 William Smith as Hoxey
 Simon Scott as General Phil Spencer
 Morgan Paull as First Lieutenant Louis Cannellis
 Bill Walker as Willard
 David Baxt as Sergeant Willard 
 Glenn Beck as Lieutenant
 Ed Bishop as Major Fox
 Phil Brown as Reverend Cartwright
 Gary Cockrell as Captain Jackson
 Don Fellows as General Stonesifer
 Weston Gavin as Lieutenant Wilson 
 Garrick Hagon as Alfie, The Driver
 Elizabeth Halliday as Stonesifer's Secretary
 David Healy as Major Winters
 Thomasine Heiner as Nurse Edith
 William Hootkins as Sergeant Fitzpatrick (as Bill Hootkins)
 Ray Jewers as Sergeant Domino
 Ron Lee as Sergeant Rappaport
 Robert Sherman as Major LeBeau
 John Ratzenberger as Sergeant Kopecki
 Robert MacLeod as State Trooper Chambers
 Lionel Murton as Colonel Horne
 Robert O'Neil as Briefing Officer
 Shane Rimmer as Colonel Alexander B. Franklin
 Pamela Roland as Sergeant Kelly
 Mark Russell as Airman Mendez
 Rich Steber as Captain Kincaid
 Drew W. Wesche as Lieutenant Witkin
 Kent O. Doering as Barker
 Allan Dean Moore as Sperling, Sharpshooter
 M. Phil Senini as Sharpshooter
 Rick Demarest as Sparrow
 Gary Harper as Air Force Sergeant Andy Keen

Production

Development
Viper Three by Walter Wager was published in 1971. Film rights were purchased that year by Lorimar Productions.

Lorimar were known for making TV series like The Waltons and Eight is Enough and TV movies like Sybil and Helter Skelter. They wanted to move into feature film production and Twilight's Last Gleamingas it would be knownwould be their first.

According to Aldrich, Lorimar "couldn't get it [a film of the novel] financed. Every actor in town had seen itincluding Burt Lancaster... If you hadn't already seen it, you were going to see it. Or you knew one or two pictures that were kind of like it... There was no social impact. The kidnappers had no interesting motivation. The reasons they wanted to get the President weren't even PLO-type reasons. They just wanted the money. That didn't seem to me to make much sense."

Lorimar took the project to Aldrich, who said he "wondered what would happen if you had an Ellsberg mentality, if you had some command officer who came out of Vietnam and who was soured not by war protestors but by the misuse of the military... What would happen if you had a general who was angry at the political use of the armed forces?"

Aldrich told Lorimar he would do the film "if I could turn that story upside down". Aldrich pitched his take on the material to Burt Lancaster, who agreed to do the film.

Lancaster called the film "All the President's Men Part Two... a very powerful political piece couched in highly melodramatic terms".

Financing
Lorimar took the project to a German company who agreed to put up two thirds of the budget. The finance came from German tax shelter money.

Merv Adelson, head of Lorimar, described the movie as "the perfect formula picture... an action-adventure picture that appeals to the international market. Pre sell it to television and abroad. Have all our money back before it opens domestically."

Adelson would later become disillusioned with this formula because the films did not achieve much critical acclaim, and if they did not perform domestically Lorimar did not make that much money out of them.

Casting
Lancaster and Aldrich thought the President could be a John F. Kennedy type. Lancaster approached Paul Newman to play the role, but he was not enthusiastic. So, Aldrich reconfigured the character as a Mayor Daley type politician.

Script
The writers Ronald M. Cohen and Edward Huebsch wrote the script together over six weeks. Aldrich called it "the most unlikely marriage in the world. Huebsch's a little wizened old man, sixty-two, sixty-three years old, been in the political wars for forty years, probably the most knowledgeable political analyst in town - or at least up there with Abe Polonsky and Ring Lardner. And Cohen is a loud-mouthed, extroverted, young, smart-ass guy who knows that he votes Democratic... an extraordinarily gifted writer in terms of what people say and how they say it. The script was originally 350 pages.

"If that movie's anti-American so is Jimmy Carter," said Aldrich. "The most inflammatory statement in the movie is that it opts for open government."

Split Screen
Aldrich decided to use split screen and multiple panels. "I don't particularly like panels unless they're in a bread commercial. But I thought they fitted that particular movie. They cost me an extra half a year - half a year. But you couldn't tell that story in less than three hours without them."

Aldrich normally used Joseph Biroc as cinematographer but Biroc's wife fell ill before shooting so Aldrich used Robert Hauser.

Filming
Filming took place in Munich in August 1976.

Several scenes were shot with Vera Miles as the president's wife but were cut to save time.

Aldrich said he hoped the audience came to realise that the Lancaster character was crazy. "But I don't think we did it. The audience is so much for those guys getting away with it." He also did not feel it was ambiguous enough at the end as to whether the shooting of the president was intentional.

Reception
James Monaco wrote that Twilight's Last Gleaming "don't do much but play with paranoia".

Release 
The film did poorly at the box office.

In France it recorded admissions of 88,945.

It was unsuited for videocassettes, because the split-screen effects do not work well in low resolution of that format.  After the rights reverted to the film's German co-producers, a major remastering effort was done by Bavaria Media, who released a Blu-ray edition, distributed in the United States by Olive Films in 2012.

See also 
Seven Days in May also stars Burt Lancaster as an Air Force general and ringleader of a group of U.S. Military leaders plotting a coup against the President.

References

External links 
 
 

1977 films
1970s thriller films
Allied Artists films
American thriller films
Cold War films
English-language German films
Films about fictional presidents of the United States
Films about nuclear war and weapons
Films based on American novels
Films directed by Robert Aldrich
Films scored by Jerry Goldsmith
Films set in Montana
Films shot at Bavaria Studios
Films shot in Germany
American heist films
West German films
American neo-noir films
1970s English-language films
1970s American films